By Grand Central Station I Sat Down and Wept is a 1945 novel in prose poetry by the Canadian author Elizabeth Smart (1913–1986). The work was inspired by Smart's passionate affair with the British poet George Barker (1913–1991).

Genesis and writing
Smart discovered Barker's poetry—specifically his poem Daedalus—in the late 1930s in Better Books on Charing Cross Road, London. Their affair lasted 18 years; Smart bore four of the 15 children he had by four women. In the novel, the multiple pregnancies are reduced to one, other details of the affair are omitted, and the narrator's lover is barely described, as Smart focuses on her own experience and feelings, which was rare for the male-centric literature of that day. Barker documented the affair in his novel The Dead Seagull (1950).

In 1941, after becoming pregnant, Smart returned to Canada, settling in Pender Harbour, British Columbia, to have their first child, Georgina, while continuing to write the book. Barker tried to visit her, but Smart's family ensured that he was turned back at the border for "moral turpitude." She moved to Washington D.C. to support herself, her daughter, and her writing by working as a file clerk for the British embassy. In 1943, in the midst of the Battle of the Atlantic, she sailed to England to join Barker, where she gave birth to their second child, Christopher. She completed the novel while working for the Ministry of Defence, which fired her after its publication.

Style and reception
The title, as a foretaste of Smart's poetic techniques, uses metre (it is largely anapaestic), contains words denoting exalted or intensified states (grandeur, centrality, weeping), and alludes to Psalm 137 ("By the waters of Babylon we lay down and wept ...") which indicates metaphorical significance for the novel's subject matter.

In an essay for Open Letters Monthly, Ingrid Norton stated "the power of emotion to transform one’s perspective on the world is the theme of this wildly poetic novel", calling it "a howl of a book, shot through with vivid imagery and ecstatic language, alternately exasperating and invigorating".

Just 2000 copies of By Grand Central Station I Sat Down and Wept were printed on its initial publication in 1945, and it did not achieve popularity at its initial release. Smart's mother Louise led a successful campaign with government officials to have its publication banned in Canada. She bought up as many copies as she could find of those that made their way into the country, and had them burned. Barker himself, in a letter to Smart, described the novel as "a Catherine wheel of a book."

The book was reissued in 1966 by Panther Books, with an introduction by the critic Brigid Brophy. At that time, the novelist Angela Carter praised the novel in a Guardian review as “like Madame Bovary blasted by lightning” but later wrote privately to her friend the critic Lorna Sage, that it inspired her to found the feminist publisher Virago Press, from "the desire that no daughter of mine should ever be in a position to be able to write BY GRAND CENTRAL STATION I SAT DOWN AND WEPT, exquisite prose though it might contain. (BY GRAND CENTRAL STATION I TORE OFF HIS BALLS would be more like it, I should hope.)" Brigid Brophy described the novel as "one of the half-dozen masterpieces of poetic prose in the world".

Legacy
The novel remains in print. It is widely regarded as a cult classic. 

Laura Lamson authored the screenplay, but this remains unproduced.

Excerpts from the novel, and other of the author's writings, feature in Elizabeth Smart: On The Side of the Angels (1991), an hour-long documentary of the writer, written and directed by Maya Gallus.

References in other media
The novel has been referenced many times by the British singer Morrissey. The title was adapted by the band The Kitchens of Distinction in the song "On Tooting Broadway Station".

The title was adapted by Ashley Hutchings for his album By Gloucester Docks I Sat Down and Wept, which includes the track "Love, Stuff and Nonsense", credited as Smart's work.

Chamber pop duo, Heavy Bell (made up of Matt Peters and Tom Keenan) released an album titled By Grand Central Station (2018), which they called "a paean to the novel: a song of praise and triumph".

See also

Nouveau réalisme
New Apocalyptics

References

External links 
 Book review at The Literary Encyclopedia
 By Grand Central Station I Sat Down and Wept: The Novel as a Poem by Alice Van Wart, in Studies in Canadian Literature
 Elizabeth Smart: Manuscript Gallery at Literary Manuscripts Collection of Library and Archives Canada
Album: By Grand Central Station by Heavy Bell
"Anarchist Surrealism & Canadian Apocalyptic Modernism: Allusive Political Praxis in Elizabeth Smart’s By Grand Central Station I Sat Down And Wept" by James Gifford 
"Rhymes of Passion" BBC Radio 4 documentary by Laura Barton, on the relationship between Elizabeth Smart and George Barker

1945 Canadian novels
1945 poems
Canadian poems
Censored books
Novels about writers